The Großer Adelberg is a hill, 567 metres high, in the Central Palatinate Forest in Germany.

Location  
The hill is located on the territory of the town of Annweiler am Trifels north of the main urban area. To the northeast is the village of Gräfenhausen. To the east is the Krappenfels rock formation and the Mittelberg hill. To the south-southwest lies the Kleine Adelberg.

Access 
To the south it is bounded by the B 10 and Landau–Rohrbach railway on which is Annweiler am Trifels station. Nearby are the Annweiler Youth Gymnastics Centre (Turnerjugendheim Annweiler) and a pumping station.

External links

References 

Mountains and hills of the Palatinate Forest
Mountains and hills of Rhineland-Palatinate